Gadpipari is a village and a Gram Panchayat in Chimur tahasil Chandrapur district. It is placed near Bhishi.

Villages in Chandrapur district